Gonaïves is an arrondissement in the Artibonite department of Haiti.
It has 263,858 inhabitants.
Postal codes in the Gonaïves Arrondissement start with the number 41.

The arrondissement consists of the following municipalities:
 Gonaïves
 Ennery
 L'Estère

References

Arrondissements of Haiti
Artibonite (department)